Beswick is a surname, possibly derived from the town of Beswick, East Riding of Yorkshire and/or from the ancient village of Beswick, Greater Manchester. The surname is common in the Manchester and Bolton area.

List of people with surname Beswick

Allan Beswick, English radio broadcaster
Bill Beswick, British sports psychologist
Bob Beswick, English Rugby League player
Frank Beswick, Baron Beswick, British Labour Co-Operative politician
Hannah Beswick, the  'Manchester Mummy'
James Wright Beswick, founder of Beswick Pottery in Staffordshire, England
John Beswick, Tasmanian politician
Joseph Dean, Baron Dean of Beswick, British Labour Party politician
Marc Beswick, Canadian footballer
Martine Beswick, Jamaican born actress and model
Sammy Beswick, English footballer
Steve Beswick, drummer with the band Slipstream

English toponymic surnames